Schupp is a surname. Notable people with the surname include:

 Johann Balthasar Schupp (1610–1661), German theologian, diplomat, pastor, innovative preacher and author of satirical tracts
 Ferdie Schupp (1891–1971), American baseball pitcher
 Fritz Schupp (1896–1974), German architect
 Philipp Schupp (1911 – 1991), American field handball player
 Julio César Schupp (d. 2005), Paraguayan diplomat
 Paul Schupp (1937–2022), American mathematician
 Markus Schupp (born 1966), German football manager and former player
 Walt Schupp (1895–1941), American football player